The Jordan National Gallery of Fine Arts is a major contemporary art museum located in Amman, Jordan.

Collections

The museum's permanent collection includes work from artists from "Algeria, Armenia, Australia, Bahrain, Denmark Egypt, France, Ghana, India, Indonesia, Iran, Iraq, Italy, Japan, Jordan, Kabardino Balkaria, Kuwait, Kyrgyzstan, Lebanon, Libya, Malaysia, Malta, Mongolia, Morocco, Netherlands, Nigeria, Oman, Pakistan, Palestine, Papua New Guinea, Peru, Philippines, Qatar, Saudi Arabia, Senegal. Spain, Sudan, Switzerland, Syria, Taiwan, Tajikistan, Thailand, Tunisia, Turkey, Turkmenistan, United Arab Emirates, UK, USA, Uzbekistan, Yemen, and the Former Republic of Yugoslavia."

Museum facilities

The museum building renovation and expansion under architect Mohamed al-Asad received the Aga Khan Award for Architecture in 2007.

70 Years of Contemporary Jordanian Art

Under the patronage of Her Majesty Queen Rania Al Abdullah, The Royal Society of Fine Arts (RSOFA) was organising Jordan's Largest Art Exhibition and hosted an art exhibition titled “70 Years of Contemporary Jordanian Art”, on May 21, 2013.  The event was showcasing over 200 works created by 195 Jordanian artists from different generations and includes paintings, sculpture, video art, photography, graphic arts, ceramics, and installations thus offering viewers a wide spectrum of creativity by Jordanian artists.

Boasting historical documentation of the Jordanian artistic heritage throughout the years, the collection on display manifests the efforts made by the Jordan National Gallery of Fine Arts to compile a comprehensive visual representation of Jordan's rich visual art history.
This exhibition is Jordan's biggest to date, effectively reflecting the gallery's role as a patron of the arts and as a reference source for those wishing to know more about Jordanian artists.

The works on display will also be featured in a catalog that documents biographical information about their creators. The book will also include a chronological history of the Jordanian art movement in its various phases while reflecting the role played by the Jordan National Gallery of Fine Arts as a promoter and patron of the arts.
The exhibition was open to the public for a period of three months.

Touring Museum
The Jordan National Gallery of Fine Arts launched the project of the Touring Museum, under the patronage of Princess Rajwa Bint Ali, President of the Royal Society of Fine Arts on Monday, May 18, 2009, in the occasion of International Museum Day.

This pioneering project aims to increase the cultural awareness in plastic and visual arts and to introduce the artistic movement in Jordan and in the Arab and developing world in different villages and provinces of the Kingdom.

The Jordan National Gallery of Fine Arts believes in the importance of spreading and introducing the artistic movement for those who live in remote areas of our beloved country.

It was first launched at Al Yazedieh secondary school for girls in the province of Salt on Monday 18 May 2009.

Many thanks for our sponsors the Ministry of Culture and the Ministry of Planning and International Cooperation for their support for this project, Touring Museum for the year, 2009.
And also many thanks for the Ministry of Education for its cooperation.

The Project includes an Exhibition for original artworks from the permanent collection of the Gallery, as well as Workshops and Lectures by artists and specialized academics.

See also
 Jordanian art
 List of national galleries

References

External links

Official Website
Profile on ARTslant

Art museums established in 1980
Contemporary art galleries
Modern art museums
Museums in Amman
Arab art scene
Jordan, Fine Arts